Resimli Perşembe (Turkish: The Illustrated Thursday) was a Turkish language weekly magazine that existed between 1925 and 1929. The magazine is one of the many publications that were established and edited by the Turkish journalist couple, Sabiha and Zekeriya Sertel.

History and profile
Resimli Perşembe was first published on 28 May 1925, and the founders were Sabiha and Zekeriya Sertel. It was published by Resimli Ay press weekly on Thursdays. Soon after the start of the magazine Zekeriya Sertel was arrested and tried in the Independence Courts which resulted in his three-year imprisonment. Therefore the magazine, which covered mostly literary and women-related articles, began to be managed by his wife Sabiha. Some of the magazine's contributors included Ahmed Rasim, Nahid Sırrı Örik, Münire Handan, Vasfi Samim and Vâlâ Nurettin.

Resimli Perşembe produced a total of 199 issues before it ceased publication on 14 March 1929.

References

1925 establishments in Turkey
1929 disestablishments in Turkey
Defunct literary magazines published in Europe
Defunct magazines published in Turkey
Literary magazines published in Turkey
Magazines established in 1925
Magazines disestablished in 1929
Magazines published in Istanbul
Turkish-language magazines